Siloam Hope First Presbyterian Church of Elizabeth (Old First of Elizabeth and formerly known as the First Presbyterian Church of Elizabeth) is a historic church at 14–44 Broad Street in Elizabeth, Union County, New Jersey, United States.

It was built in 1783 and added to the National Register of Historic Places in 1977 for its significance in architecture.

The churchyard dates from 1687 and has over two thousand graves, many from the American Revolutionary War, including the Reverend James Caldwell.

In 2013, a Bible dating from 1699 belonging to founder John Ogden (colonist) was returned to the congregation.

In 2019, the First Presbyterian Church merged with the Siloam Hope Presbyterian Church, becoming the Siloam Hope First Presbyterian Church. The newly merged congregation would remain at its original Broad Street location.

See also
National Register of Historic Places listings in Union County, New Jersey

References

External links 

 

History of Elizabeth, New Jersey
Churches on the National Register of Historic Places in New Jersey
Gothic Revival church buildings in New Jersey
Churches completed in 1783
Churches in Union County, New Jersey
Presbyterian churches in New Jersey
National Register of Historic Places in Union County, New Jersey
Buildings and structures in Elizabeth, New Jersey
18th-century Presbyterian church buildings in the United States